Anthony Joseph Cannella (born March 22, 1969) is an American politician who previously served in the California State Senate. A Republican, he represented the 12th Senate District, which encompasses all of both Merced and San Benito counties, as well as parts of Fresno, Madera, Monterey, and Stanislaus counties. Prior to his election to the State Senate, he served as the Mayor of Ceres.

He is the son of Sal Cannella, a former Democratic Assemblymember who also represented portions of the Central Valley.

Biography

Anthony Cannella was elected to the State Senate in 2010, defeating state Assemblywoman Anna Caballero in a surprise, with assistance from the California Chamber of Commerce, and easily re-elected in 2014 as one of few Republicans endorsed by the California Labor Federation. In April 2017 he was the only Republican Senator to vote in favor of Senate Bill 1, the Road Repair & Accountability Act of 2017 (more widely known and reported as the "Gas Tax"); he was promised transportation assistance for the University of California, Merced, and an extension of the Altamont Corridor Express rail line to his district. The Senate bill includes a 20-cent per gallon increase in diesel taxes, a 12-cent per gallon hike in gas taxes and a 5.75 percent increase in diesel sales taxes. Vehicle license fees would be raised an average $38 per vehicle. Drivers would also face a new annual fee to be paid with their vehicle registration, ranging from $25 to $175 depending on the value of their vehicle. The taxes and fees rise each year with inflation. Funds would be used to improve roads, highways and transportation systems in California.

Electoral history

2010

2014

References

External links 
 Anthony Cannella's Voting Records at Vote Smart
 Join California Anthony Cannella

1969 births
Living people
21st-century American businesspeople
Republican Party California state senators
Mayors of places in California
People from Ceres, California
University of California, Davis alumni
21st-century American politicians